The Government House of Baku, also known as House of Government, is a government building housing various state ministries of Azerbaijan. It is located on Neftchiler Avenue and faces the Baku Boulevard. The rear side of the building faces busy Uzeyir Hajibeyov Street of central Baku. Government House was designed for 5,500 people.

History of the building
From 1924 to 1927, construction of several large government buildings was planned and included in the budget of Baku. In 1934, the Soviet authorities announced a tender for the construction of the Baku Soviet Palace (later renamed the Government House). The competition was won by well known architects Lev Rudnev, Vladimir Munts and K. Tkachenko (participant). With some alterations to the project, the building of the Government House was built between 1936 and 1952.

The construction of the building also led to construction of Lenin Square (later renamed Azadliq Square) in front of the Government House. In 1955, a monument to Vladimir Lenin facing Azadliq Square sculpted by Jalal Garyaghdi was installed in front of the building. In addition to this, a large complex of buildings around the Government House was built in 1960 – 1970s which included hotels "Azerbaijan" and "Absheron", 16-story buildings on Uzeyir Hajibeyov street, building of Azərpoçt.

Lenin's statue was later removed during the Azerbaijani independence movement in the aftermath of bloody Black January. A large Azerbaijan flag now stands where Lenin's statue stood. Lenin square was renamed Azadliq Square (Freedom Square).

After independence
The building housed many organizations and business firms after restoration of Azerbaijani independence in 1991. After complete renovation of the building, all business firms were moved to other locations in the city and the offices were provided to governmental organizations. Among them, State Committee for Ecology and Environmental Protection, Ministry of Agriculture and Produce, State Committee for Geology and Mineral Resources, State Committee for Hydrometeorology, State Committee for Material Resources, State Committee for Improvements of Soil and Water Economy.

In 2006, the government of Azerbaijan started renovation works of the building and completed the project in 2010. 40.8 million Azerbaijani manats were spent for reconstruction and enrichment of the park surrounding the building. Being in the center of Baku, the Government House is among the most visited tourist attractions of Azerbaijan. 
Currently, several ministries including the Ministry of Culture and Tourism, Ministry of Agriculture, Ministry of Labor and Social Protection of Population, State Procurement Agency and the Copyright Agency of the republic occupy the building offices.

Picture gallery

See also
 Mayoralty of Baku

References

External links

 Google Maps profile

1952 establishments in Azerbaijan
Baroque architecture in Azerbaijan
Buildings and structures in Baku
Government buildings completed in 1952
Government buildings in Azerbaijan
Presidential residences